Pimiento loaf, more commonly pimento loaf, also called pickle and pimiento loaf, pickle and pimento loaf, or P&P loaf, is a loaf-type luncheon meat containing finely chopped beef and pork, as well as chopped pickles and pimientos. After being formed into a loaf and cooked, the loaf is kept whole so it can be sliced and served cold as deli meat. Pimento loaf is closely related to olive loaf (the primary difference being pimentos and pickles replacing pimento-stuffed olives) and spiced luncheon loaf.  It is distantly related to ham and cheese loaf.

Unlike bologna and salami, which are sausages, pimento loaf is baked like a meatloaf in a loaf pan. Inexpensive pimento loaf is made with chicken and other ingredients common to inexpensive bologna.  Also, less expensive pimento loaves are baked in sleeves instead of pans to give the cold cuts a round appearance, leading to the misconception that pimento loaf is related to bologna.  Since pickles are typically less expensive than olives, pimento loaf is far more common as an inexpensive deli meat.

References

Lunch meat